The plantar cuboideonavicular ligament is a fibrous band that connects the plantar surfaces of the cuboid and navicular bones.

Ligaments of the lower limb